Nychthemeron , occasionally nycthemeron or nuchthemeron, is a period of 24 consecutive hours. It is sometimes used, especially in technical literature, to avoid the ambiguity inherent in the term day.

It is the period of time that a calendar normally labels with a date, although a nychthemeron simply designates a time-span that can start at any time, not just midnight.

Etymology 
It is a loanword from Ancient Greek , which appears in the New Testament.

In other languages
Some languages have a word for 24 hours, or more loosely a day plus a night in no particular order. Unlike a calendar date, only the length is defined, with no particular start or end. Furthermore, these words are considered basic and native to these languages, so unlike nychthemeron they are not associated with jargon.

Words for 24 hours are listed in the middle column. For comparison, the word for day, in the meaning of daytime, the sunlit state, the opposite of night, is also listed in the rightmost column:

The word , as in the Nordic languages, is etymologically the same as day in English.

References

Units of time
Calendars